Harold Cox (1859–1936) was an English politician.

Harold Cox may also refer to:

Roxbee Cox, Baron Kings Norton (Harold Roxbee Cox, 1902–1997), British aeronautical engineer
Harold E. Cox (1931–2021), American historian

See also
William Harold Cox (1901–1988), U.S. federal judge from Mississippi
Harry Cox (disambiguation)